This is a list of Yemen national football team's all kinds of competitive records.

Individual records

Player records

Manager records

Team records

Competition records

World Cup record

AFC Asian Cup record

All qualifications

Asian Games record
Football at the Asian Games has been an under-23 tournament since 2002.

Arabian Gulf Cup record

Arab Cup record

Pan Arab Games record

WAFF Championship

Palestine Cup of Nations

Head-to-head record 
The list shown below shows the Yemen national football team all-time international record against opposing nations.

^ Include

External links
 FIFA.com
 World Football Elo Ratings: Yemen

record
National association football team records and statistics